Carter v Boehm (1766) 3 Burr 1905 is a landmark English contract law case, in which Lord Mansfield established the duty of utmost good faith or uberrimae fidei in insurance contracts.

Facts
Carter was the Governor of Fort Marlborough (now Bengkulu, Sumatra), built by the British East India Company. Carter took out an insurance policy with Boehm against the fort being taken by a foreign enemy. A witness, Captain Tryon, testified that Carter was aware that the fort was built to resist attacks from natives but would be unable to repel European enemies, and he knew the French were likely to attack. The French successfully attacked, but Boehm refused to honour the indemnifier Carter, who promptly sued.

Judgment
Lord Mansfield held that Mr Carter, as the proposer owed a duty of utmost good faith (uberrimae fidei) to the insurer, he was required to disclose all facts material to the risk:

Lord Mansfield went on to hold that the duty was reciprocal and that if an insurer withheld material facts, the example cited being that an insured vessel had already arrived safely, the policyholder could declare the policy void and recover the premium.

Lord Mansfield proceeded to qualify the duty of disclosure:

Lord Mansfield found in favour of the policyholder on the grounds that the insurer knew or ought to have known that the risk existed as the political situation was public knowledge:

Significance
In Manifest Shipping Co Ltd v Uni-Polaris Shipping Co Ltd John Hobhouse, Baron Hobhouse of Woodborough said,

See also

Da Costa v Jones (1778) 2 Cowp 729
HIH Casualty and General Insurance Ltd v Chase Manhattan Bank Rix LJ stated, "I am conscious that in Carter v. Boehm itself Lord Mansfield does seem to have considered that there was a difference between the concealment which the duty of good faith prohibited and mere silence (‘Aliud est celare; aliud tacere…).  As a result, non-disclosure in the insurance context in the early years was referred to as a ‘concealment’, and the doctrine has sometimes been viewed and explained as constructive fraud.  However, Lord Mansfield was seeking to propound a doctrine of good faith which would extend through the law of contract, and in that respect his view did not bear fruit.  Where, however, in the insurance context it put down firm roots, it came to be seen as a doctrine which went much further than the antithesis of fraud, and, as it came to be developed, “non-disclosure will in a substantial proportion of cases be the result of an innocent mistake."
English contract law
Good faith
List of cases involving Lord Mansfield

References

Citations

Sources 

 Stephen Watterson, ‘Carter v Boehm (1766)’, ch 3 in C Mitchell and P Mitchell, Landmark Cases in the Law of Contract (Hart Publishing, 2008).

English contract case law
Lord Mansfield cases
English good faith case law
1766 in case law
1766 in British law
Court of King's Bench (England) cases